Anatoly Yakovlyevich Sliva (born 10 February 1940), is a Belarusian-born Russian jurist and politician who had served as the judge of the Constitutional Court of Russia from 1998 to 2010.

Biography
Anatoly Sliva was born in Propoysk (present day Slawharad), Belarus on 10 February 1940. In 1967, he graduated from the Faculty of Law of Lomonosov Moscow State University.

On 13 February 1992, he was appointed deputy head of the State Legal Department of the President of Russian, as the Head of the Department for Interaction with Representative and Executive Authorities and National Policy. From 22 March 1992 to 31 March 1993, he was the Acting Head of the State Legal Department of the President of Russia.

Between 1993 to 1996, Sliva was a member of the State Duma, and was the Chairman of the State Duma Committee on Local Self-Government. On 4 January 1994, he was relieved of his post as Deputy Head of the State Legal Department of the President of Russia, and the Head of the department in connection with his election as a member of the State Duma.

On 14 October 1998, Sliva was appointed a judge of the Constitutional Court of Russia. He resigned from the court on 18 March 2010.

References

Judges of the Constitutional Court of Russia
Russian politicians
1940 births
Living people
Recipients of the Order "For Merit to the Fatherland", 4th class
People from Slawharad District
Moscow State University alumni
First convocation members of the State Duma (Russian Federation)
Party of Russian Unity and Accord politicians